The 2019–20 Milwaukee Panthers men's basketball team represented the University of Wisconsin–Milwaukee during the 2019–20 NCAA Division I men's basketball season. The Panthers, led by third-year head coach Pat Baldwin, played their home games at the UW–Milwaukee Panther Arena and the Klotsche Center as members of the Horizon League. They finished the season 12–19, 7–11 in Horizon League play to finish in a tie for seventh place. They lost in the first round of the Horizon League tournament to Youngstown State.

Previous season
The Panthers finished the 2018–19 season 9–22, 4–14 in Horizon League play to finish in last place. They failed to qualify for the Horizon League tournament.

Roster

Schedule and results 

|-
!colspan=9 style=| Exhibition

|-
!colspan=9 style=| Non-conference regular season

|-
!colspan=9 style=| Horizon League regular season

|-
!colspan=9 style=|Horizon League tournament

Source

References

Milwaukee Panthers men's basketball seasons
Milwaukee
Milwaukee
Milwaukee